Gwen Leticia Wallace (born 10 August 1935) is a former Australian athletics competitor. During the 1954 British Empire and Commonwealth Games in Vancouver, she won a gold medal in the 4 × 110 yards relay, and also competed in the long jump, high jump and 80 metres hurdles events.

Born in New South Wales, Wallace was married to Test cricket batsman Norm O'Neill from 1958 until his death in 2008. The couple had three children, including first-class cricketer Mark O'Neill.

References

1935 births
Living people
20th-century Australian women
21st-century Australian women
21st-century Australian people
Athletes (track and field) at the 1954 British Empire and Commonwealth Games
Australian female hurdlers
Australian female high jumpers
Australian female long jumpers
Australian female sprinters
Commonwealth Games gold medallists for Australia
Sportswomen from New South Wales
Commonwealth Games medallists in athletics
Medallists at the 1954 British Empire and Commonwealth Games